F2F may refer to:

 Friend-to-friend, a type of private P2P computer network
 Firewall-to-firewall transfers, an important part of most modern P2P network designs
  FAI CLASS F2F -  Diesel Powered Profile Fuselage  Control Line Team Racing  Model Aircraft.
 F2F (TV series), a UK youth chat show
 "F2F" (song) by SZA, from her 2022 album SOS
 Grumman F2F, a biplane fighter aircraft
 Face to Face (disambiguation)
 Forecast-to-Fulfil, a term used in supply chain management, particularly in relation to cash flow or financial management
 Frequency/double frequency or Aiken Biphase.  See Differential Manchester encoding.